Grace Carter (born 26 May 1997) is an English singer and songwriter. She moved to Brighton at the age of eight, with her mother, but is now based in London. She released her debut single, "Silence", in May 2017. She rose to prominence after supporting Dua Lipa on tour during The Self-Titled Tour in October 2017, and has additionally been a supporting act for other performers including Rag'n'Bone Man. In 2018-19, she headlined two tours of the UK and Europe. Carter placed third in BBC Music's "Sound of 2019" poll of industry experts and artists. Her father was absent from her life, as he was raising another family; her step-father is singer-songwriter and former Music Week journalist Paul Phillips, who she credits with the idea of venting her frustration by writing about it.

Discography

Extended plays

Singles

As lead artist

As featured artist

References

1997 births
Living people
Polydor Records artists
Singers from London
21st-century English women singers
21st-century English singers